The 1900 Albion football team, sometimes known as the Albion Methodists, was an American football team that represented Albion College in the Michigan Intercollegiate Athletic Association (MIAA) during the 1900 college football season. The team compiled a 6–1–2 record and won the MIAA championship.

The team also swept a two-game series with Michigan Agricultural (later renamed Michigan State University), defeating the Aggies by scores of 23–0 and 29–0.

Albion was led in 1900 by second-year head coach Chester Brewer who went on to be the head coach at Michigan State for 10 years and the athletic director at the University of Missouri for 13 years.

Joe Maddock played principally at right halfback and was the star of the 1900 Albion team.  Maddock later became a star for Fielding H. Yost's undefeated national championship teams at Michigan in 1902 and 1903.

Schedule

References

Albion
Albion Britons football seasons
Albion football